Torquay Lifeboat Station was the base for Royal National Lifeboat Institution (RNLI) search and rescue operations at Torquay, Devon in England from 1876 until 1923. A second lifeboat was kept at the harbour from 1917 until 1928.

History
The RNLI had stationed a lifeboat at Brixham in 1866 but ten years later they opened a second station on Torbay. The boathouse was built at the Ladies Bathing Cove (Beacon Cove) on a site donated by Sir Lawrence Palk and the lifeboat arrived on 22 May 1876. Brixham was equipped with a motor lifeboat in 1922 which could cover a larger sea area in more extreme conditions. Changes in the shape of the beach at the Ladies Bathing Cove were also making it difficult to launch the lifeboat, so on 31 March 1923 the station was closed The boathouse was later used as a café but was demolished in 1975.

The managing director of local shipping company Whiteways and Ball presented the  Torquay Harbour Lifesaving Boat to the RNLI in 1917 on the understanding that it would be kept operational even if the lifeboat station at the Ladies Bathing Cove closed. For the first year it of its operation it was kept on davits on Beacon Quay but from 1918 it was kept afloat in the harbour until 1928.

Description
The boathouse was built in a decorative style at the back of the Ladies Bathing Cove under the cliff. Above the double opening doors was a bay window that give views of operations.

Fleet

References

External links
  The History of Torbay Lifeboat Stations

Lifeboat stations in Devon
Buildings and structures in Torquay